City of London ward clubs are civil society organisations based in the wards of the City of London. Every ward has such a club.

Contemporary Ward Club
The United Wards Club was founded in 1877 by Joseph Newbon.

References

Organisations based in the City of London
Ward clubs